The Nine-Power Treaty (Japanese:  or Nine-Power Agreement was a 1922 treaty affirming the sovereignty and territorial integrity of the Republic of China as per the Open Door Policy. The Nine-Power Treaty was signed on 6 February 1922 by all of the attendees to the Washington Naval Conference: Belgium, China, France, Great Britain, Italy, Japan, the Netherlands, Portugal, and the United States.

Open Door Policy

United States Secretary of State John Hay had issued the "Open Door Notes" of September–November 1899, followed by a diplomatic circular in July 1900, asking that all of the major world powers with vested interests in China declare formally that they would maintain an 'open door' to allow all nations equal rights and equal access to the treaty ports within their spheres of influence in China. Fearing that the European powers and Japan were preparing to carve China up into colonies, Hay also added provisions that Chinese territorial and administrative integrity should be maintained.

Although no nation specifically affirmed Hay’s proposal, Hay announced that each of the powers had granted consent in principle and treaties made after 1900 make reference to the Open Door Policy. Nonetheless, competition between the various powers for special concessions within Qing dynasty Imperial China for railroad rights, mining rights, loans, foreign trade ports, and privilege continued unabated.

The United States was especially leery of Japanese designs on China, after the Russo-Japanese War (1904–1905) and the Twenty-One Demands (1915) and repeatedly signed agreements with the Japanese government pledging to maintain a policy of equality in Manchuria and the rest of Mainland China. These agreements concluded with Lansing–Ishii Agreement in 1917, which was soon shown to be completely ineffective.

Washington Naval Conference
During the Washington Naval Conference of 1921–1922, the United States government again raised the Open Door Policy as an international issue, and had all of the attendees (United States, Republic of China, Imperial Japan, France, Great Britain, Italy, Belgium, Netherlands, and Portugal) sign the Nine-Power Treaty which intended to make the Open Door Policy international law.

The Nine-Power Treaty, concurrent with the Shantung Treaty of the Washington Naval Conference, effectively prompted Japan to return territorial control of Shandong province, of the Shandong Problem, to the Republic of China. The Nine-Power Treaty was one of several treaties concluded at the Washington Naval Conference. Other major agreements included the Four-Power Treaty, the Five-Power Treaty, and the Shangtung Treaty.

Effectiveness
The Nine-Power Treaty lacked any enforcement regulations, and when violated by Japan during its invasion of Manchuria in 1931 and creation of Manchukuo, the United States could do little more than issue protests and impose economic sanctions. In November 1937, the signatories of the Nine-Power Treaty convened in Brussels for the Nine Power Treaty Conference after the outbreak of the Second Sino-Japanese War but to no avail. However, the treaty eventually had a role in checking Japanese aggression during the 1932 Battle of Shanghai.

World War II effectively ended the Nine-Power Treaty.

References

Sources and further reading
 
 Ellis, L. Ethan. Republican foreign policy, 1921-1933. Rutgers University Press, 1968. pp. 79–136.
 Fenwick, C. G. "The Nine Power Treaty and the Present Crisis in China". American Journal of International Law 31.4 (1937): 671-674. .

External links
 "Principles and Policies Concerning China (Nine-Power Treaty), Feb. 6, 1922, 44 Stat. 213, 2 U.S.T. 375"
 The full text of the Nine-Power Treaty

Interwar-period treaties
Treaties concluded in 1922
Treaties of the Republic of China (1912–1949)
Treaties of the United States
Treaties of the Empire of Japan
1922 in China
1922 in Japan